This is a list of the National Register of Historic Places listings in Crockett County, Texas.

This is intended to be a complete list of properties and districts listed on the National Register of Historic Places in Crockett County, Texas. There are one district and six individual properties listed on the National Register in the county. These properties include two State Antiquities Landmarks one of which is a State Historic Site while the other is a Recorded Texas Historic Landmark.

Current listings

The publicly disclosed locations of National Register properties and districts may be seen in a mapping service provided.

|}

See also

National Register of Historic Places listings in Texas
Recorded Texas Historic Landmarks in Crockett County

References

External links

Crockett County, Texas
Crockett County
Buildings and structures in Crockett County, Texas